Mullanur Waxitof isemendäge is a rural locality (a derevnya) in Yuğarı Oslan District, Tatarstan. The population was 203 as of 2010.

Geography 
Mullanur Waxitof isemendäge is located 25 km south of Yuğarı Oslan, district's administrative centre, and 57 km southwest of Qazan, republic's capital, by road.

History 
The village was established in 1919 or 1920.

Until 1927 was a part of Zöyä Canton; after the creation of districts in Tatar ASSR (Tatarstan) in Tämte (1927–1931), Yuğarı Oslan (1931–1963),  Yäşel Üzän (1963–1965) and Yuğarı Oslan districts.

References

External links 
 

Rural localities in Verkhneuslonsky District